Concordia High School, originally named Concordia College, and subsequently Concordia College High School until 1997, was created with the purpose of preparing young men to attend the Lutheran Seminary in St. Louis, Missouri. Once ordained, they would return to the Canadian Prairies to open up new Lutheran churches. Concordia was established in 1921 with a first class of eighth grade boys. In the 1940s the school became co-ed and became an academic prep school.  After World War II the high school continued as a grade nine to twelve program.

In 1987 Concordia University College of Alberta was granted degree-granting status. The history and growth of the university is largely owed to the small academic high school that gradually added junior college courses to the high school program until it grew into a full-fledged university college on the same campus, gradually crowding out the original high school program. Many students as a matter of course received their high school diploma and took university courses at Concordia until either graduation or in order to transfer to the University of Alberta. Some of the university faculty as well were previous students or teachers at the high school.

In 2000 the high school program was fully detached from the university program. Concordia High School was incorporated as a separate entity with its own board of governors separate from the governance of the university. In 1997 the high school moved to the north edge of campus at 112 Avenue and 73 Street in Edmonton, where it remained for 14 years.

In July 2011 Concordia High School moved to 830 Saddleback Road (the former Taylor College and Seminary campus) in the south end of Edmonton. Concordia High School permanently closed on August 20, 2012. The school's board of governors issued a statement that they had been informed in an unanticipated development that the facility lease would not be renewed, and that they had been unable to find an alternative facility for dormitory and classroom space; however, the landlord company stated that the school had defaulted on its lease in January 2012, and the lease was later terminated when the school informed the landlord that they were insolvent and would not open for the 2012–13 school year.

References

Educational institutions established in 1921
Educational institutions disestablished in 2012
High schools in Edmonton
Private schools in Alberta
Defunct schools in Canada
1921 establishments in Alberta
2012 disestablishments in Alberta